Jonathan B. Tucker (August 2, 1954 – July 31, 2011) was a United States chemical and biological weapons expert.

Early life and education
Tucker was born on August 2, 1954 in Boston, Massachusetts to Deborah Tucker. Tucker earned a B.S. in biology from Yale University and a Ph.D. in political science (focusing on defense and arms control study) from MIT.

Career
After finishing his studies Tucker worked as an arms control specialist for the Congressional Office of Technology Assessment, the U.S. Arms Control & Disarmament Agency, and the U.S. State Department. He was an editor at High Technology and Scientific American magazines and wrote about military technologies, biotechnology, and biomedical research. Tucker was a UN weapons biological inspector in Iraq in February 1995.

From 1996, he served as founding director of the Chemical and Biological Weapons Nonproliferation Program at the James Martin Center for Nonproliferation Studies of the Monterey Institute of International Studies, and then served as a senior fellow in its Washington Office. He was a professional staff member for the bipartisan Commission on the Prevention of WMD proliferation and terrorism, which published World at Risk, a volume critical of US prevention strategies for post-9/11 terrorism.

In 2010, Tucker spent a semester teaching and researching at the TU Darmstadt in Germany as an endowed professor of peace and security studies, and most recently was a senior fellow at the Federation of American Scientists in Washington, D.C.

Death 
On July 31, 2011, Tucker was found dead in his home in Washington D.C. He was 56.

Published works
Articles
 
Books
 
  (editor)

References

External links

 

1954 births
2011 deaths
Yale College alumni
MIT School of Humanities, Arts, and Social Sciences alumni
People related to biological warfare
Academic staff of Technische Universität Darmstadt